October File is the second album by Die Kreuzen, released in May 1986 through Touch and Go Records.

Track listing

Personnel 
Die Kreuzen
Keith Brammer – bass guitar
Brian Egeness – guitar
Dan Kubinski – vocals
Erik Tunison – drums
Production and additional personnel
Rick Canzano – engineering
Die Kreuzen – production
Corey Rusk – production
Jose M. Ysaguirre – photography

References

External links 
 

1986 albums
Die Kreuzen albums
Touch and Go Records albums